Penstemon pennellianus, often called the Blue Mountain beardtongue or Blue Mountain penstemon, is a species of beardtongue native to Washington and Oregon.

Description 
The Blue Mountain penstemon is a medium-sized perennial flower that grows 8 to 24 inches tall. It usually grows with clumps of basal leaves that are narrow, oblong and 3 to 10 inches long. Stem leaves clasping with the largest ones midstem and are oval-shaped with pointed tips. Flowers are a well-spaced cluster that grows tighter towards the top. The flowers are blue or purple and are 1 to  inches long, with a short-haired staminode at the throat, and sparse hairy anthers inside.

Range 
This species is endemic to the Blue Mountains in southeastern Washington and northeastern Oregon. It reportedly grows in the following counties; Columbia (WA), Garfield (WA), Asotin (WA), Umatilla (OR), Union (OR), Wallowa (OR) and Grant (OR). It is possible it also grows in Whitman County, Washington.

Habitat 
Subalpine areas, usually on rocky soil on the east side of hills or mountains. Open forests, ridge tops and gravelly slopes.

References 

Flora of Oregon
Flora of Washington (state)
pennellianus
Plants described in 1940
Flora without expected TNC conservation status